Jumar, fullname Jumar José da Costa Júnior  (born April 28, 1986), is a Brazilian former footballer who played as a midfielder. He was born in Bandeirantes, Paraná.

Honours 
 Palmeiras
 Campeonato Paulista: 2008

 Vasco da Gama
 Copa do Brasil: 2011

 Londrina
 Primeira Liga: 2017

External links
 

1986 births
Living people
Brazilian footballers
Brazilian expatriate footballers
Expatriate footballers in China
Brazilian expatriate sportspeople in China
People from Bandeirantes
Association football midfielders
Campeonato Brasileiro Série A players
Chinese Super League players
Sociedade Esportiva Palmeiras players
CR Vasco da Gama players
Desportivo Brasil players
Paraná Clube players
Guangzhou City F.C. players
Londrina Esporte Clube players
Sportspeople from Paraná (state)